The 1905 Argentine Primera División was the 14th season of top-flight football in Argentina. The season began on May 7 and ended on September 24 The 1905 championship was expanded to include 7 teams, who played in a league format, with each team playing the other twice.

Alumni was the champion, winning its 5th league title in six seasons. The squad won the tournament after a 1–1 draw v. Estudiantes de Buenos Aires, one fixture before the end of the season. The line-up for that match was: José Buruca Laforia; Carlos Carr Brown, Jorge Gibson Brown; Andrés Mack, Patricio Barron Browne, Ernesto Brown; Gottlob Eduardo Weiss, Juan J. Moore, Alfredo Brown, Eliseo Brown, Eugenio Moore. 

A new team, Reformer, from the city of Campana, registered to play the tournament. The team made a poor campaign, finishing the season with 60 goals conceded in 12 matches played.

Final standings

References

Argentine Primera División seasons
1905 in Argentine football
1905 in South American football
1905 in South American football leagues